Casanova Lerrone is a comune (municipality) in the Province of Savona in the Italian region Liguria, located about  southwest of Genoa and about  southwest of Savona.

Casanova Lerrone borders the following municipalities: Borghetto d'Arroscia, Cesio, Garlenda, Onzo, Ortovero, Ranzo, Stellanello, Testico, Vessalico, and Villanova d'Albenga.

References

Cities and towns in Liguria